Alessandro Angelo Epis (born 27 August 1937) is a former Australian rules footballer who represented  in the Victorian Football League (VFL) during the 1950s and 1960s.

Early life and career
Epis was born and raised in the Western Australian goldfields town of Boulder. He had a sister, Ena. Both his father, Virgilio, and mother, Giusefina (née Borlini), hailed from the Province of Bergamo in northern Italy.

Epis made his name as a promising player in the Goldfields National Football League (GNFL) with the Mines Rovers club, winning the Fletcher Medal in 1955. He sought a clearance to  but was refused. Epis played on the half-back flank and on the wing. When he arrived at Essendon he worked as a butcher. He was a part of two premiership teams with the Bombers.

After Playing
In 1972, Epis set up his own cleaning service. It was taken over by James Aforozis, but Epis has continued as a consultant to the business. He also owns the 'Epis' and 'Epis and Williams' wineries and vineyards.

References

External links

Past Player Profile at Essendon Football Club
Alec Epis Cleaning Services

1937 births
Australian rules footballers from Western Australia
Essendon Football Club players
Essendon Football Club Premiership players
Mines Rovers Football Club players
Living people
People from Kalgoorlie
Two-time VFL/AFL Premiership players